Corto may refer to:
another word for ristretto, a very "short" shot of espresso coffee
Jon Corto (born 1984), National Football League player with the Buffalo Bills
Corto Maltese, the British hero of the Italian comic series of the same name
Willis Corto, a major character in the science fiction novel Neuromancer
Corto.io, an open-source component framework for autonomous IoT applications
the Spanish translation meaning short, curt, brief, narrow, skimpy, scanty, timid, stumpy, or bashful.